Bulgaria competed at the 2004 Summer Paralympics in Athens, Greece. The team included 10 athletes, 7 men and 3 women, but won no medals.

Sports

Athletics

Men's track

Men's field

Women's field

Powerlifting

Swimming

See also
Bulgaria at the Paralympics
Bulgaria at the 2004 Summer Olympics

References 

Nations at the 2004 Summer Paralympics
2004
Summer Paralympics